Opisthocosmiinae is a subfamily of earwigs in the family Forficulidae. There are about 18 genera and more than 100 described species in Opisthocosmiinae.

Genera
These 18 genera belong to the subfamily Opisthocosmiinae:

 Acanthocordax Günther, 1929
 Chaetocosmia Nishikawa, 1973
 Cipex Burr, 1910
 Cordax Burr, 1910
 Eparchus Burr, 1907
 Eutimomena Bey-Bienko, 1970
 Hypurgus Burr, 1907
 Neoopisthocosmia Steinmann, 1990
 Opisthocosmia Dohrn, 1865
 Parasondax Srivastava, 1978
 Parasyntonus Steinmann, 1990
 Paratimomenus Steinmann, 1974
 Pareparchus Burr, 1911
 Prosadiya Hebard, 1923
 Sondax Burr, 1910
 Spinosocordax Steinmann, 1988
 Syntonus Burr, 1910
 Timomenus Burr, 1907

References

Further reading

External links

 

Forficulidae